was a  after Shōka and before Bun'ō. This period spanned the years from March 1259 through April 1260.

Change of era
 1259 : The new era name was created to mark an event or a number of events. The years of the Shōgen era was in a period marked by famine and epidemics; and the era name was changed in quick succession in the hope that this might bring them to a close.  The previous era ended and a new one commenced in Shōka 3.

Events
 1259 (Shōgen 1, 11th month): In the 14th year of Go-Fukakusa-tennōs reign (後深草天皇14年), the emperor abdicated; and the succession (senso) was received by his younger brother. Shortly thereafter, Emperor Kameyama is said to have acceded to the throne (sokui).

Notes

References
 Nussbaum, Louis-Frédéric and Käthe Roth. (2005).  Japan encyclopedia. Cambridge: Harvard University Press. ;  OCLC 58053128
 Titsingh, Isaac. (1834). Nihon Odai Ichiran; ou,  Annales des empereurs du Japon.  Paris: Royal Asiatic Society, Oriental Translation Fund of Great Britain and Ireland. OCLC 5850691
 Varley, H. Paul. (1980). A Chronicle of Gods and Sovereigns: Jinnō Shōtōki of Kitabatake Chikafusa. New York: Columbia University Press. ;  OCLC 6042764

External links
 National Diet Library, "The Japanese Calendar" -- historical overview plus illustrative images from library's collection

Japanese eras
1250s in Japan
1260s in Japan